Leandro García Morales (born June 27, 1980 in Montevideo) is a Uruguayan-Italian professional basketball player. At a height 1.88 m (6'2") tall, he plays at the shooting guard position. He was also a member of the senior Uruguayan national basketball team. He currently plays for Club Atlético Aguada.

College career
García Morales moved from Montevideo to Hialeah, Florida, to attend high school there. He was joined in his senior season by fellow Uruguayan national team member, Martin Osimani, at Champagnat Catholic High School. He first attended NCAA Division II school Lynn University.  In his only season with the school, he earned NCAA Division II All-American Honorable Mention honors, and was named to the All-Freshman Team.

García Morales then transferred to Miami-Dade Community College. In one season there, he finished in the top ten in the nation in scoring, assists, and steals, while averaging 22.9 points, 9 assists, and 3.6 steals per game. He earned All-Region honors.  After one season of playing JUCO ball, García Morales again committed to play college basketball, this time at Texas A&M University, after originally also considering the University of Miami, Xavier University, and Auburn University, among others.  He played two seasons with the Aggies, averaging 6.5 points and 1.9 assists per game in his senior season.

Professional career
After graduating from college, García Morales played for teams in Italy, Argentina, Venezuela, Iran, Mexico, and Puerto Rico. Along with Martin Osimani, he helped lead Club Biguá to the 2008 Uruguayan League championship, averaging 25.9 points per game for the team.

With Cocodrilos de Caracas, he won the Venezuelan League championship in 2008 and 2010. With Halcones UV Xalapa, he also won the Mexican League championship in 2010.

National team career
Garcia Morales was also a member of the senior Uruguayan national basketball team. Some of the tournaments he played at include the 2005, 2007, and 2009 editions of the FIBA AmeriCup.

References

External links
FIBA Profile
LatinBasket.com Profile
Italian League Profile 
ProSports Profile

1980 births
Living people
A.S. Junior Pallacanestro Casale players
Basketball players at the 2007 Pan American Games
Capitanes de Arecibo players
Club Biguá de Villa Biarritz basketball players
Club San Martín de Corrientes basketball players
Cocodrilos de Caracas players
Halcones de Xalapa players
Hickman High School alumni
Italian men's basketball players
Lynn Fighting Knights men's basketball players
Miami Dade Sharks men's basketball players
Pan American Games bronze medalists for Uruguay
Pan American Games medalists in basketball
Point guards
Shooting guards
Sportspeople from Montevideo
Texas A&M Aggies men's basketball players
Uruguayan expatriate basketball people in the United States
Uruguayan men's basketball players
Viola Reggio Calabria players
Medalists at the 2007 Pan American Games
Club Atlético Aguada players